Mathilda (Mattie) Lietz (21 July 1893 in Peoria, Illinois - 15 January 1956 in Grand Detour, Illinois) was an American painter.

Early career
Lietz spent most of her career living in Peoria, Illinois where she worked as a painter and educator.  She studied at Butler University in Irvington, Indiana and later attended The Art Institute of Chicago where she studied with Oberteuffer, John Thomas Nolf, George Elmer Browne, Frederick Milton Grant, and Henrik Asor Hansen.

Associations
Her professional associations included:
 La Grande Art League
 Hoosier Salon Art Gallery
 The Art Institute of Chicago
 All-Illinois Fine Art Association
 Burpee Art Gallery in Rockford, Illinois
 The Chicago Galleries Association
 National Academy of Design (NYC)
 The Association of Chicago Painters & Sculptors

Works
Some of Lietz’s works can be found at:
 The Tipton, Indiana, Public Library
 The Cossette School in La Grande, Illinois
 The Norton Art Gallery in Palm Beach, Florida
 MattieLietz.com

References

Who's Who in Women's Art
 Chris Pettey’s Dictionary of Women Artists

Artists from Peoria, Illinois
1893 births
1956 deaths
American watercolorists
American women painters
Painters from Illinois
20th-century American painters
20th-century American women artists
Women watercolorists
Butler University alumni
School of the Art Institute of Chicago alumni